Jiwaña (Aymara for to die / massacre, slaughter, slaughtering, Hispanicized names Coverane, Coverane Gihuana, Gihuana, Koverane) is a mountain in the Andes of southern Peru, about  high. It is located in the Puno Region, El Collao Province, Capazo District. Jiwaña lies west of Tuma Tumani and southeast of Wila Chunkara. It is south of the plain named Jiwaña Pampa (Jihuaña Pampa). The Jiwaña River (Jihuaña) originates near the mountain. It flows through the plain before it reaches the Mawri River (Mauri).

References

Mountains of Peru
Mountains of Puno Region